Materials Evaluation is a monthly peer-reviewed scientific journal covering nondestructive testing, evaluation, and inspection published by the American Society for Nondestructive Testing. The journal was established in 1942.

External links 
 

Materials science journals
Monthly journals
English-language journals
Publications established in 1942
1942 establishments in the United States